Zuzana Pavelková (born 16 March 1992) is a Czech female badminton player.

Achievements

BWF International Challenge/Series
Women's singles

 BWF International Challenge tournament
 BWF International Series tournament
 BWF Future Series tournament

References

External links
 
 Official Website

1992 births
Living people
Sportspeople from Přerov
Czech female badminton players